Linda Cropper (born 1 January 1958) is an Australian actress, primarily known for her role as Geraldine Proudman in the TV series Offspring and as Dame Nellie Melba in the television series Melba. An shortened edited version of the television series was selected for screening as a film at a Royal Command Performance before Queen Elizabeth II in London.

Television

Television credits apart from Offspring include the lead role of opera legend Nellie Melba in Melba as well as roles in ABC mini-series Palace of Dreams, Edens Lost, Ring of Scorpio, Bordertown, Wildside, Water Rats, All Saints, White Collar Blue and The Pacific. She had a recurring role as Xhalax Sun during the third season of the Australian-American science fiction series Farscape.

Theatre 

Cropper's many theatre credits include Simon Phillip's co-production of Poor Boy for the Melbourne Theatre Company and Sydney Theatre Company, and the role of Lady Macbeth in Bell Shakespeare's Macbeth.

Other credits with Bell Shakespeare include Romeo and Juliet, Twelfth Night, As You Like It and Hamlet.  Sydney Theatre Company credits include Arcadia, Month in the Country, Top Girls, and Great Expectations.

She played the solo role Melbourne Theatre Company's production of The Architect by Aidan Fennessy in 2018.

Film
Cropper's film credits include Teesh and Trude (2002), Little Fish (2005) and Fool's Gold (2008).

FILM

Accolades

In 2010, Cropper was nominated for an AACTA Award for Best Guest or Supporting Actress in a Drama Series for her performance Satisfaction, and also in the 1989 AACTAs for Best Actress in a Miniseries, for Edens Lost.

She won the Green Room Award (Performer, Theatre Companies) in 2019 for her 2018 performance in The Architect.

References

External links
 
 

Australian film actresses
Australian stage actresses
Australian television actresses
Living people
People educated at Abbotsleigh
20th-century Australian actresses
21st-century Australian actresses
1949 births